Dmitri Anatolyevich Pyatibratov (born 24 May 1976) is a Russian professional football coach and a former player. He is the manager of FC Fakel Voronezh.

Club career
He made his debut in the Russian Premier League in 2001 for FC Alania Vladikavkaz.

Coaching career
On 6 September 2022, Pyatibratov was appointed caretaker manager of FC Fakel Voronezh in the Russian Premier League. On 18 September 2022, he was confirmed as Fakel's manager on a permanent basis.

References

1976 births
Living people
People from Belaya Kalitva
Russian footballers
Russian Premier League players
FC Spartak Vladikavkaz players
FC Amkar Perm players
FC Zvezda Irkutsk players
FC Irtysh Pavlodar players
FC Zhemchuzhina Sochi players
FC Rostov players
Russian expatriate footballers
Expatriate footballers in Kazakhstan
Russian expatriate sportspeople in Kazakhstan
FC Volgar Astrakhan players
Russian football managers
FC Mordovia Saransk players
FC Nika Krasny Sulin players
Association football defenders
Sportspeople from Rostov Oblast
FC Fakel Voronezh managers
Russian Premier League managers